SciLifeLab (Science for Life Laboratory) is a world-leading Swedish national center for large-scale research and one of the largest molecular biology research laboratories in Europe at the forefront of innovation in life sciences research, computational biology, bioinformatics, training and services in molecular biosciences with focus on health and environmental research. The center combines frontline technical expertise with advanced knowledge of translational medicine and molecular bioscience.

SciLifeLab is a joint effort between four of the best ranked institutions in Sweden and Scandinavia (Karolinska Institutet—the institution that awards the Nobel Prize in Physiology or Medicine, KTH Royal Institute of Technology, Stockholm University and Uppsala University). The National Genomics Infrastructure (NGI) hosted at SciLifeLab offers large-scale DNA sequence data generation and analysis.

SciLifeLab was established in 2010 and was appointed a national center in 2013 by the Swedish government. More than 200 elite research groups composed by 1,500 researchers are associated and work at SciLifeLab's two campuses in Stockholm and Uppsala. The Stockholm campus is surrounded by one of the largest hospitals in Europe both the old and the new Karolinska University Hospital buildings, the Karolinska Institutet and the European Centre for Disease Prevention and Control.

SciLifeLab is provided with SEK 150 million per year in state funds separate from other national and European grants and infrastructure support in the fields of drug discovery, drug development and fundamental research. Together with the prestigious American journal Science, SciLifeLab awards a young researcher prize. From 2018, SciLifeLab nominates Sjöstrand Lecturer in Structural Biology that would particularly spend time with students and postdocs during a visit to Sweden

External links
 SciLifeLab web site
 KTH web site
 Karolinska Institutet web site
 Stockholm University web site
 Uppsala University web site

References

Bioinformatics organizations
Genetics or genomics research institutions
KTH Royal Institute of Technology
Karolinska Institute
Stockholm University